Guillermo Martín Reyes Maneiro (born 10 July 1986) is an Uruguayan footballer who currently plays for Primera B side Universidad de Concepción.

References
 
 

1986 births
Living people
People from Mercedes, Uruguay
Uruguayan footballers
Uruguayan expatriate footballers
Peñarol players
Rocha F.C. players
Danubio F.C. players
C.A. Rentistas players
C.D. Huachipato footballers
Uruguayan Primera División players
Chilean Primera División players
Expatriate footballers in Chile
Association football goalkeepers